The Delaware Independent School Conference (DISC) is a high-school athletic conference, whose members are private schools located primarily in Delaware.

Its members include:
 Sanford School
 St. Andrew's School
 The Tatnall School
 Tower Hill School
 Wilmington Christian School (joined in 2017)

 Wilmington Friends School

Pennsylvania's Westtown School was a member of the DISC from 1968 until 2015.

References

Delaware high school sports conferences